Dundalk entered the 1990–91 season having ended the previous season trophy-less for the first time since Turlough O'Connor's debut season as manager in 1985–86. They also had no European football, having not qualified for any of the competitions the season before. It was Dundalk's 65th consecutive season in the top tier of Irish football.

Season summary
A number of key players from the Double-winning 1987–88 season had moved on at the end of 1989–90, and they were joined early on by Tony Cousins, who signed for Liverpool in September. A new look side opened the season with a 7–0 hammering of Longford Town in the Leinster Senior Cup, but some poor results saw early exits in both the Leinster Cup and the League of Ireland Cup. The 33-round League programme commenced on 2 September 1990, and in the opening match Dundalk were well beaten by Shelbourne, 5–1. That defeat, after a poor sequence, sparked a recovery and, with the exception of two defeats to newly promoted Sligo Rovers, they went the rest of the season unbeaten. Midway through the season, however, they suffered a shock 1–0 defeat in the FAI Cup to non-League Ashtown Villa. The league schedule was completed on 21 April 1991 and, in an end of season, winner takes all match in Turner's Cross against Cork City, Dundalk won the title for the eighth time, with the winning goal being scored by cult hero, Tom McNulty.

First-Team Squad (1990–91)
Sources:

Competitions

Leinster Senior Cup
Source:
First Round

Second round

League Cup
Source:
Group

Did not qualify for Quarter-final

Premier Division
Source:

League table

FAI Cup

First Round

Awards

Player of the Month

Footnotes

References
Bibliography

Citations

Dundalk F.C. seasons
Dundalk